Leaf is a Japanese visual novel studio under the publisher Aquaplus, and has offices in Yodogawa-ku, Osaka, and Tokyo. It and its competitor Key (to which it is often compared) are two of the most popular and successful dedicated visual novel studios operating today. It was launched out of obscurity by its early release To Heart. Leaf used the XviD video codec in several games: Aruru to Asobo!!, Tears to Tiara, Kusari, and ToHeart2 X Rated. Since XviD is free software, released under the GPL, Leaf was obligated to release the source code to those games under the same license. One still requires the game data to actually play the games with the source code. In addition, a free software game engine, named xlvns, was developed soon after Leaf released its first three visual novels. Characters from Utawarerumono, Tears to Tiara, To Heart, and Kizuato are playable in Aquapazza: Aquaplus Dream Match, a fighting game developed by Aquaplus featuring characters from various Leaf games.

Titles

DR2 Night Janki (1995)
Filsnown (1995)
Leaf Visual Novel Series (LVNS)
Shizuku (1996)
Kizuato (1996)
To Heart (1997)
Routes (2003)
White Album (1998)
Comic Party (1999)
Magical Antique (2000)
Tasogare (2001)
Utawarerumono (2002)
December When There Is No Angel (2003)
Tears to Tiara (2005)
Kusari (2005)
To Heart 2 XRATED  (2005)
FullAni (2006)
To Heart 2: Another Days (2008)
Kimi ga Yobu, Megido no Oka de (2008)
White Album 2: Introductory Chapter (2010)
Hoshi no Ouji-kun (2011)
White Album 2: Closing Chapter (2011)
Tears to Tiara II: Haou no Matsuei (2013)
Utawarerumono: Itsuwari no Kamen (2015)

Leaf amusement softs
Saorin to Issho!! (1996)
Hatsune no Naisho!! (1997)
Inagawa de Ikou!! (2000)
Aruru to Asobo!! (2004)
Manaka de Ikuno!! (2009)

References

External links
 Leaf's official website 
P/ECE's official Website 

Hentai companies
Mass media in Osaka